Eugene Thomas Maleska (January 6, 1916 – August 3, 1993) was an American crossword puzzle constructor and editor. He edited The New York Times crossword puzzle from 1977 to 1993.

Early life and education career
Maleska was born on January 6, 1916, in Jersey City. He graduated from Regis High School in New York City. He received his bachelor's and master's degrees from Montclair State College and began his career teaching Latin and English at a junior high school in Palisades Park, New Jersey.

Eugene moved to Frederick Douglass Junior High School in Manhattan in 1940 as an English teacher. In 1946 he became an assistant to the principal at P.S. 169, then principal at P.S. 192 in the early 1950s. He took a yearlong sabbatical to attend Harvard University, where he earned a doctorate in education. He then was the principal at J.H.S. 164 from 1955 to 1958. From 1962 to 1967, he was an assistant superintendent of schools in District 8 in the Bronx. He then spent three years as an associate director of the Center for Urban Education before returning as the superintendent of District 8. He was the only person to have a New York City public school named for him during his lifetime: Intermediate School 174 in the Bronx, dedicated in 1973, the year he retired as superintendent. The first principal of this school was Chester Cohen, and the first Assistant Principal was Stephen Wulfson.  Eugene T. Maleska was an amateur poet and published a book of poems, Sun & Shadows in 1961.

Puzzling career

Before Maleska became crossword editor, The New York Times published dozens of crosswords that he had submitted as a freelance contributor. He became editor in 1977, replacing Will Weng. Besides numerous collections of puzzles, Maleska also published Maleska's Favorite Word Games and A Pleasure in Words, which included a chapter on constructing crossword puzzles. As an editor, Maleska preferred references from the classics to more familiar material. He often wrote famously mean rejection letters to aspiring constructors. In 1993, Maleska was succeeded by Will Shortz, who remains editor to this day.

Personal life

He married Jean (c. 1915–1983) and had two children: Merryl Maleska Wilbur and Gary Maleska. Maleska married Annrea (Neill) Sutton on February 9, 1985, in Barnstable, Massachusetts. They divorced at some point and Maleska married Carol Atkinson as his third wife on March 11, 1992. Carol had previously been married. Maleska died in Daytona Beach, Florida in 1993 of throat cancer. He also had a home in Wareham, Massachusetts.

References

1916 births
1993 deaths
The New York Times editors
Montclair State University alumni
Harvard Graduate School of Education alumni
Writers from Jersey City, New Jersey
20th-century American writers
Crossword compilers
Deaths from throat cancer
Regis High School (New York City) alumni
Deaths from cancer in Florida